The Bayfield Historic District is an area spanning 60 blocks in Bayfield, Wisconsin. It was added to the National Register of Historic Places in 1980.

References

Historic districts on the National Register of Historic Places in Wisconsin
National Register of Historic Places in Bayfield County, Wisconsin